Air Chief Marshal Sir John Barraclough  (2 May 1918 – 10 May 2008) was a Royal Air Force pilot during the Second World War who went on to become Vice-Chief of the Defence Staff.

Early life
Barraclough was born on 2 May 1918. He was educated at Cranbrook School, in Cranbrook, Kent.

Military career
Barraclough joined the Artists Rifles in 1935. He was commissioned into the Royal Air Force in 1938.

Barraclough served in the Second World War flying maritime patrol aircraft. On 29 October 1940, it was gazetted that he was promoted to flying officer on 3 September 1940. However, on 14 January 1941, this was substituted for the granting of the war substantive rank of flying officer back dated to 12 August 1940. He was promoted to war substantive flight lieutenant on 12 August 1941. By February 1943, he was an acting squadron leader and flying with No. 209 Squadron RAF which was stationed in East Africa. On 14 March 1943, he was promoted to flight lieutenant. By the end of 1945, he was an acting wing commander.

He became Commanding Officer of RAF Biggin Hill in 1955 and of RAF Middleton St. George in 1957. In 1958 he took charge of Operations and Training at Headquarters Far East Air Force.

He became Director of Public Relations for the RAF in 1961 and Air Officer Commanding No. 19 Group RAF in 1964. He then became Air Officer Administration for Bomber Command in 1967 and for Strike Command in 1968. In 1970 he became Vice-Chief of the Defence Staff and in 1972 he was made Air Secretary. His last appointment was as Commandant of the Royal College of Defence Studies in 1974.

He was appointed Honorary Inspector-General of the Royal Auxiliary Air Force on 1 January 1984.

Family
In 1946 he married Maureen McCormack and they went on to have one daughter.

Honours and decorations
Barraclough was awarded the Distinguished Flying Cross (DFC) on 16 February 1943 "for gallantry and devotion to duty in the execution of air operations". It was gazetted in the 1946 New Year Honours, that he had been Mentioned in Despatches.

He was appointed Companion of the Order of the Bath (CB) in the 1969 New Year Honours.

 Knight Commander of the Order of the Bath – 13 June 1970
 Commander of the Order of the British Empire – 10 June 1961
 Distinguished Flying Cross – 16 February 1943
 Air Force Cross – 1941
 Officer of the Venerable Order of Saint John – 1985
 Queen's Commendation for Valuable Service in the Air – 1 June 1953
 Mentioned in Despatches – 1 January 1946
 Fellow of the Royal Aeronautical Society
 Fellow of the Royal Society of Arts
 FIPM
 FBIM (MBIM)
 FIPR (MIPR)

References

External links
Telegraph.co.uk – Air Chief Marshal Sir John Barraclough
Times Online – Air Chief Marshal Sir John Barraclough
Independent.co.uk – Air Chief Marshal Sir John Barraclough

 

|-

|-

1918 births
2008 deaths
Royal Air Force air marshals
British World War II pilots
Artists' Rifles soldiers
Knights Commander of the Order of the Bath
Commanders of the Order of the British Empire
Recipients of the Distinguished Flying Cross (United Kingdom)
Recipients of the Air Force Cross (United Kingdom)
Recipients of the Commendation for Valuable Service in the Air
Fellows of the Royal Aeronautical Society
People educated at Cranbrook School, Kent